This is a list of butterflies of the Comoro Islands. About 88 species are known from the Comoros, 19 of which are endemic.

This is a list of butterfly species which have been recorded on the Comoros and on Mayotte, which is geographically part of the Comoro Islands.

Papilionidae

Papilioninae

Papilionini
Papilio aristophontes Oberthür, 1897 (endemic)
Papilio dardanus humbloti Oberthür, 1888
Papilio demodocus Esper, [1798]
Papilio epiphorbas guyonnaudi Turlin & Guilbot, 1990
Papilio epiphorbas praedicta Turlin & Guilbot, 1990

Leptocercini
Graphium evombar viossati Collins, 1997
Graphium angolanus (Goeze, 1779)
Graphium levassori (Oberthür, 1886) (endemic)

Pieridae

Coliadinae
Eurema brigitta pulchella (Boisduval, 1833)
Eurema desjardinsii (Boisduval, 1833)
Eurema floricola anjuana (Butler, 1879)
Eurema hecabe solifera (Butler, 1875)
Catopsilia florella (Fabricius, 1775)

Pierinae
Colotis euippe omphale (Godart, 1819)
Colotis evanthe (Boisduval, 1836)
Colotis evanthides (Holland, 1896)

Pierini
Appias epaphia contracta (Butler, 1888)
Appias sabina comorensis Talbot, 1943
Mylothris humbloti (Oberthür, 1888) (endemic)
Mylothris ngaziya (Oberthür, 1888) (endemic)
Belenois creona elisa (van Vollenhoven, 1869)

Lycaenidae

Theclinae

Theclini
Hypolycaena philippus ramonza (Saalmüller, 1878)
Deudorix antalus (Hopffer, 1855)
Deudorix dinochares Grose-Smith, 1887

Polyommatinae

Polyommatini
Cacyreus darius (Mabille, 1877)
Leptotes casca (Tite, 1958) (endemic)
Leptotes mayottensis (Tite, 1958) (endemic)
Zizina antanossa (Mabille, 1877)
Actizera lucida (Trimen, 1883)
Azanus sitalces mayotti d'Abrera, 1980
Eicochrysops damiri Turlin, 1995 (endemic)
Eicochrysops sanguigutta (Mabille, 1879)
Euchrysops osiris (Hopffer, 1855)

Nymphalidae

Danainae

Danaini
Danaus chrysippus orientis (Aurivillius, 1909)
Danaus dorippus (Klug, 1845)
Amauris comorana Oberthür, 1897 (endemic)
Amauris nossima (Ward, 1870)
Amauris ochlea affinis Aurivillius, 1911
Amauris ochlea moya Turlin, 1994

Satyrinae

Melanitini
Melanitis leda (Linnaeus, 1758)

Satyrini
Bicyclus anynana (Butler, 1879)
Heteropsis comorana comorana (Oberthür, 1916) (endemic)
Heteropsis comorana subrufa (Turlin, 1994) (endemic)
Heteropsis narcissus fraterna (Butler, 1868)
Heteropsis narcissus comorensis (Oberthür, 1916)
Heteropsis narcissus salimi (Turlin, 1994)
Heteropsis narcissus mayottensis (Oberthür, 1916)

Charaxinae

Charaxini
Charaxes saperanus Poulton, 1926 (endemic)
Charaxes castor comoranus Rothschild, 1903
Charaxes paradoxa Lathy, 1925 (endemic)
Charaxes nicati Canu, 1991 (endemic)
Charaxes viossati Canu, 1991 (endemic)

Nymphalinae

Nymphalini
Junonia goudotii (Boisduval, 1833)
Junonia oenone (Linnaeus, 1758)
Junonia rhadama (Boisduval, 1833)
Salamis humbloti Turlin, 1994 (endemic)
Hypolimnas anthedon drucei (Butler, 1874)
Hypolimnas misippus (Linnaeus, 1764)
Vanessa dimorphica comoroica (Howarth, 1966)

Biblidinae

Biblidini
Byblia anvatara (Boisduval, 1833)
Eurytela dryope lineata Aurivillius, 1899

Limenitinae

Limenitidini
Pseudacraea imerina anjouana Collins, 1991
Pseudacraea lucretia comorana Oberthür, 1890
Pseudacraea lucretia karthalae Collins, 1991

Neptidini
Neptis comorarum comorarum Oberthür, 1890 (endemic)
Neptis comorarum legrandi Turlin, 1994 (endemic)
Neptis cormilloti Turlin, 1994 (endemic)
Neptis mayottensis Oberthür, 1890 (endemic)

Heliconiinae

Acraeini
Acraea serena (Fabricius, 1775)
Acraea dammii van Vollenhoven, 1869
Acraea igati Boisduval, 1833
Acraea ranavalona Boisduval, 1833
Acraea lia Mabille, 1879
Acraea esebria Hewitson, 1861
Acraea masaris masaris Oberthür, 1893 (endemic)
Acraea masaris jodina Pierre, 1992 (endemic)
Acraea comor Pierre, 1992 (endemic)

Vagrantini
Phalanta eurytis (Doubleday, 1847)
Phalanta phalantha aethiopica (Rothschild & Jordan, 1903)

Hesperiidae

Coeliadinae
Coeliades forestan (Stoll, [1782])
Coeliades ramanatek comorana Evans, 1937

Pyrginae

Tagiadini
Tagiades insularis grandis Evans, 1937
Tagiades insularis mayotta Evans, 1937
Tagiades samborana rana Evans, 1937
Eagris sabadius comorana Evans, 1937
Eagris sabadius isabella Turlin, 1995

Hesperiinae

Aeromachini
Artitropa erinnys comorarum Oberthür, 1916

Baorini
Pelopidas mathias (Fabricius, 1798)
Borbo fatuellus dolens (Mabille, 1898)
Borbo gemella (Mabille, 1884)

See also
List of moths of the Comoros
Wildlife of the Comoros

References

Butterflies

Comoros
Comoros
Butterflies